A crossbow is a ranged weapon using an elastic launching device consisting of a bow-like assembly called a prod, mounted horizontally on a main frame called a tiller, which is hand-held in a similar fashion to the stock of a long firearm. Crossbows shoot arrow-like projectiles called bolts or quarrels. A person who shoots crossbow is called a crossbowman or an arbalist (after the arbalest, a European crossbow variant used during the 12th century).

Crossbows and bows use the same launch principle, but an archer must maintain a bow's draw by pitching the bowstring with fingers, pulling it back with arm and back muscles and then holding that form in order to aim. This demands significant physical strength. A crossbow has a locking mechanism to maintain the draw, limiting the shooter's exertion to pulling the string into the lock and then releasing the shot by depressing a lever/trigger. This enables a crossbowman to handle more draw weight, and to hold it with significantly less physical strain, thus potentially achieving better precision.

The earliest known crossbows were made in the first millennium BC, not later than the 7th century BC in ancient China, and not later than the 1st century AD in Greece (as the gastraphetes); each civilization developed the weapon independently. Crossbows brought about a major shift in the role of projectile weaponry in wars, such as during Qin's unification wars and later the Han campaigns against northern nomads and western states. The medieval European crossbow was called by many names, including "crossbow" itself; most of these names derived from the word ballista, an ancient Greek torsion siege engine similar in appearance but different in design principle.

In modern times, firearms have largely supplanted bows and crossbows as weapons of warfare. However, crossbows still remain widely used for competitive shooting sports and hunting, or for relatively silent shooting.

Terminology
A crossbowman or crossbow-maker is sometimes called an arbalista, arbalist or arbalest. The last two are also used to refer to the crossbow.

Arrow, bolt and quarrel are all suitable terms for crossbow projectiles.

The lath, also called the prod, is the bow of the crossbow. According to W.F. Peterson, the prod came into usage in the 19th century as a result of mistranslating rodd in a 16th-century list of crossbow effects.

The stock is the wooden body on which the bow is mounted, although the medieval tiller is also used.

The lock refers to the release mechanism, including the string, sears, trigger lever, and housing.

Construction

A crossbow is essentially a bow mounted on an elongated frame (called a tiller or stock) with a built-in mechanism that holds the drawn bow string, as well as a trigger mechanism which is used to release the string.

Chinese vertical trigger lock

The Chinese trigger was a mechanism typically composed of three cast bronze pieces housed inside a hollow bronze enclosure. The entire mechanism is then dropped into a carved slot within the tiller and secured together by two bronze rods. The string catch (nut) is shaped like a "J" because it usually has a tall erect rear spine that protrudes above the housing, which serves the function of both a cocking lever (by pushing the drawn string onto it) and a primitive rear sight. It is held stationary against tension by the second piece, which is shaped like a flattened "C" and acts as the sear. The sear cannot move as it is trapped by the third piece, i.e. the actual trigger blade, which hangs vertically below the enclosure and catches the sear via a notch. The two bearing surfaces between the three trigger pieces each offers a mechanical advantage, which allow for handling significant draw weights with a much smaller pull weight. During shooting, the user will hold the crossbow at eye level by a vertical handle and aim along the arrow using the sighting spine for elevation, similar to how a modern rifleman shoots with iron sights. When the trigger blade is pulled, its notch disengages from the sear and allows the latter to drop downwards, which in turn frees up the nuts to pivot forward and release the bowstring.

European rolling nut lock
The earliest European designs featured a transverse slot in the top surface of the frame, down into which the string was placed. To shoot this design, a vertical rod is thrust up through a hole in the bottom of the notch, forcing the string out. This rod is usually attached perpendicular to a rear-facing lever called a tickler. A later design implemented a rolling cylindrical pawl called a nut to retain the string. This nut has a perpendicular centre slot for the bolt, and an intersecting axial slot for the string, along with a lower face or slot against which the internal trigger sits. They often also have some form of strengthening internal sear or trigger face, usually of metal. These roller nuts were either free-floating in their close-fitting hole across the stock, tied in with a binding of sinew or other strong cording; or mounted on a metal axle or pins. Removable or integral plates of wood, ivory, or metal on the sides of the stock kept the nut in place laterally. Nuts were made of antler, bone, or metal. Bows could be kept taut and ready to shoot for some time with little physical straining, allowing crossbowmen to aim better without fatiguing.

Bow
Chinese crossbow bows were made of composite material from the start.

European crossbows from the 10th to 12th centuries used wood for the bow, also called the prod or lath, which tended to be ash or yew.

Composite bows started appearing in Europe during the 13th century and could be made from layers of different material, often wood, horn, and sinew glued together and bound with animal tendon. These composite bows made of several layers are much stronger and more efficient in releasing energy than simple wooden bows.

As steel became more widely available in Europe around the 14th century, steel prods came into use.

Traditionally, the prod was often lashed to the stock with rope, whipcord, or other strong cording. This is called the bridle

Spanning mechanism
The Chinese used winches for large crossbows mounted on fortifications or wagons, known as "bedded crossbows" (床弩). Winches may have been used for handheld crossbows during the Han dynasty (202 BC–9 AD, 25–220 AD), but there is only one known depiction of it. The 11th century Chinese military text Wujing Zongyao mentions types of crossbows using winch mechanisms, but it is not known if these were actually handheld crossbows or mounted crossbows. Another drawing method involved the shooters sitting on the ground, and using the combined strength of leg, waist, back and arm muscles to help span much heavier crossbows, which were aptly called "waist-spun crossbows" (腰張弩).

During the Medieval period, both Chinese and European crossbows used stirrups as well as belt hooks. In the 13th century, European crossbows started using winches, and from the 14th century an assortment of spanning mechanisms such as winch pulleys, cord pulleys, gaffles (such as gaffe levers, goat's foot levers, and rarer internal lever-action mechanisms), cranequins, and even screws.

Variants 

The smallest crossbows are pistol crossbows. Others are simple long stocks with the crossbow mounted on them. These could be shot from under the arm. The next step in development was stocks of the shape that would later be used for firearms, which allowed better aiming. The arbalest was a heavy crossbow that required special systems for pulling the sinew via windlasses. For siege warfare, the size of crossbows was further increased to hurl large projectiles, such as rocks, at fortifications. The required crossbows needed a massive base frame and powerful windlass devices.

Projectiles

The arrow-like projectiles of a crossbow are called crossbow bolts. These are usually much shorter than arrows, but can be several times heavier. There is an optimum weight for bolts to achieve maximum kinetic energy, which varies depending on the strength and characteristics of the crossbow, but most could pass through common mail. Crossbow bolts can be fitted with a variety of heads, some with sickle-shaped heads to cut rope or rigging; but the most common today is a four-sided point called a quarrel. A highly specialized type of bolt is employed to collect blubber biopsy samples used in biology research.

Even relatively small differences in arrow weight can have a considerable impact on its drop and, conversely, its flight trajectory.

Bullet-shooting crossbows are modified crossbows that use bullets or stones as projectiles.

Accessories

The ancient Chinese crossbow often included a metal (i.e. bronze or steel) grid serving as iron sights. Modern crossbow sights often use similar technology to modern firearm sights, such as red dot sights and telescopic sights. Many crossbow scopes feature multiple crosshairs to compensate for the significant effects of gravity over different ranges. In most cases, a newly bought crossbow will need to be sighted for accurate shooting.

A major cause of the sound of shooting a crossbow is vibration of various components. Crossbow silencers are multiple components placed on high vibration parts, such as the string and limbs, to dampen vibration and suppress the sound of loosing the bolt.

History

China 

In terms of archaeological evidence, crossbow locks made of cast bronze have been found in China dating to around 650 BC. They have also been found in Tombs 3 and 12 at Qufu, Shandong, previously the capital of Lu, and date to the 6th century BC. Bronze crossbow bolts dating from the mid-5th century BC have been found at a Chu burial site in Yutaishan, Jiangling County, Hubei Province. Other early finds of crossbows were discovered in Tomb 138 at Saobatang, Hunan Province, and date to the mid-4th century BC. It is possible that these early crossbows used spherical pellets for ammunition. A Western Han mathematician and music theorist, Jing Fang (78–37 BC), compared the moon to the shape of a round crossbow bullet. The Zhuangzi also mentions crossbow bullets.

The earliest Chinese documents mentioning a crossbow were texts from the 4th to 3rd centuries BC attributed to the followers of Mozi. This source refers to the use of a giant crossbow between the 6th and 5th centuries BC, corresponding to the late Spring and Autumn Period. Sun Tzu's The Art of War (first appearance dated between 500 BC to 300 BC) refers to the characteristics and use of crossbows in chapters 5 and 12 respectively, and compares a drawn crossbow to "might". The Huainanzi advises its readers not to use crossbows in marshland where the surface is soft and it is hard to arm the crossbow with the foot. The Records of the Grand Historian, completed in 94 BC, mentions that Sun Bin defeated Pang Juan by ambushing him with a battalion of crossbowmen at the Battle of Maling in 342 BC. The Book of Han, finished 111 AD, lists two military treatises on crossbows.

Handheld crossbows with complex bronze trigger mechanisms have also been found with the Terracotta Army in the tomb of Qin Shi Huang (r. 221–210 BC) that are similar to specimens from the subsequent Han dynasty (202 BC–220 AD), while crossbowmen described in the Qin and Han dynasty learned drill formations, some were even mounted as charioteers and cavalry units, and Han dynasty writers attributed the success of numerous battles against the Xiongnu and Western Regions city-states to massed crossbow volleys. The bronze triggers were designed in such a way that they were able to store a large amount of energy within the bow when drawn, but was easily shot with little resistance and recoil when the trigger were pulled. The trigger nut also had a long vertical spine that could be used like a primitive rear sight for elevation adjustment, which allowed precision shooting over longer distances. The Qin/Han-era crossbow was also an early example of modular design, as the bronze trigger components were also mass-produced with relative precise tolerances so that the parts are interchangeable between different crossbows. The trigger mechanism from one crossbow can be installed into another simply by dropping into a tiller slot of the same specifications and secured with dowel pins. Some crossbow designs were also found to be fitted with bronze buttplates and trigger guard.

It is clear from surviving inventory lists in Gansu and Xinjiang that the crossbow was greatly favored by the Han dynasty. For example, in one batch of slips there are only two mentions of bows, but thirty mentions of crossbows. Crossbows were mass-produced in state armories with designs improving as time went on, such as the use of a mulberry wood stock and brass; a crossbow in 1068 could pierce a tree at 140 paces. Crossbows were used in numbers as large as 50,000 starting from the Qin dynasty and upwards of several hundred thousand during the Han. According to one authority, the crossbow had become "nothing less than the standard weapon of the Han armies", by the second century BC.

After the Han dynasty, the crossbow lost favor during the Six Dynasties until it experienced a mild resurgence during the Tang dynasty, under which the ideal expeditionary army of 20,000 included 2,200 archers and 2,000 crossbowmen. Li Jing and Li Quan prescribed 20 percent of the infantry to be armed with crossbows.

During the Song dynasty, the crossbow received a huge upsurge in military usage, and often overshadowed the bow 2 to 1 in numbers. During this time period, a stirrup was added for ease of loading. The Song government attempted to restrict the public use of crossbows and sought ways to keep both body armors and crossbows out of civilian ownership. Despite the ban on certain types of crossbows, the weapon experienced an upsurge in civilian usage as both a hunting weapon and pastime. The "romantic young people from rich families, and others who had nothing particular to do" formed crossbow shooting clubs as a way to pass time.

During the late Ming dynasty, no crossbows were mentioned to have been produced in the three-year period from 1619 to 1622. With 21,188,366 taels, the Ming manufactured 25,134 cannons, 8,252 small guns, 6,425 muskets, 4,090 culverins, 98,547 polearms and swords, 26,214 great "horse decapitator" swords, 42,800 bows, 1,000 great axes, 2,284,000 arrows, 180,000 fire arrows, 64,000 bow strings, and hundreds of transport carts.

Military crossbows were armed by treading, or basically placing the feet on the bow stave and drawing it using one's arms and back muscles. During the Song dynasty, stirrups were added for ease of drawing and to mitigate damage to the bow. Alternatively the bow could also be drawn by a belt claw attached to the waist, but this was done lying down, as was the case for all large crossbows. Winch-drawing was used for the large mounted crossbows as seen below, but evidence for its use in Chinese hand-crossbows is scant.

Other sorts of crossbows also existed, such as the repeating crossbow, multi-shot crossbow, larger field artillery crossbows, and repeating multi-shot crossbow.

Southeast Asia

Around the third century BC, King An Dương of Âu Lạc (modern-day northern Vietnam) and (modern-day southern China) commissioned a man named Cao Lỗ (or Cao Thông) to construct a crossbow and christened it "Saintly Crossbow of the Supernaturally Luminous Golden Claw" (nỏ thần), which could kill 300 men in one shot. According to historian Keith Taylor, the crossbow, along with the word for it, seems to have been introduced into China from Austroasiatic peoples in the south around the fourth century BC. However, this is contradicted by crossbow locks found in ancient Chinese Zhou dynasty tombs dating to the 600s BC.

In 315 AD, Nu Wen taught the Chams how to build fortifications and use crossbows. The Chams would later give the Chinese crossbows as presents on at least one occasion.

Crossbow technology for crossbows with more than one prod was transferred from the Chinese to Champa, which Champa used in its invasion of the Khmer Empire's Angkor in 1177. When the Chams sacked Angkor they used the Chinese siege crossbow. The Chinese taught the Chams how to use crossbows and mounted archery Crossbows and archery in 1171. The Khmer also had double bow crossbows mounted on elephants, which Michel Jacq-Hergoualc'h suggests were elements of Cham mercenaries in Jayavarman VII's army.

The native Montagnards of Vietnam's Central Highlands were also known to have used crossbows, as both a tool for hunting, and later, an effective weapon against the Viet Cong during the Vietnam War. Montagnard fighters armed with crossbows proved a highly valuable asset to the US Special Forces operating in Vietnam, and it was not uncommon for the Green Berets to integrate Montagnard crossbowmen into their strike teams.

Ancient Greece 

The earliest crossbow-like weapons in Europe probably emerged around the late 5th century BC when the gastraphetes, an ancient Greek crossbow, appeared. The device was described by the Greek author Heron of Alexandria in his Belopoeica ("On Catapult-making"), which draws on an earlier account of his compatriot engineer Ctesibius (fl. 285–222 BC). According to Heron, the gastraphetes was the forerunner of the later catapult, which places its invention some unknown time prior to 399 BC. The gastraphetes was a crossbow mounted on a stock divided into a lower and upper section. The lower was a case fixed to the bow while the upper was a slider which had the same dimensions as the case. Meaning "belly-bow", it was called as such because the concave withdrawal rest at one end of the stock was placed against the stomach of the operator, which he could press to withdraw the slider before attaching a string to the trigger and loading the bolt; this could thus store more energy than regular Greek bows. It was used in the Siege of Motya in 397 BC. This was a key Carthaginian stronghold in Sicily, as described in the 1st century AD by Heron of Alexandria in his book Belopoeica.

Other arrow shooting machines such as the larger ballista and smaller Scorpio also existed starting from around 338 BC, but these are torsion catapults and not considered crossbows. Arrow-shooting machines (katapeltai) are briefly mentioned by Aeneas Tacticus in his treatise on siegecraft written around 350 BC. An Athenian inventory from 330 to 329 BC includes catapults bolts with heads and flights. Arrow-shooting machines in action are reported from Philip II's siege of Perinthos in Thrace in 340 BC. At the same time, Greek fortifications began to feature high towers with shuttered windows in the top, presumably to house anti-personnel arrow shooters, as in Aigosthena.

Ancient Rome 

The late 4th century author Vegetius, in his De Re Militari, describes arcubalistarii (crossbowmen) working together with archers and artillerymen. However it is disputed if arcuballistas were crossbows or torsion powered weapons. The idea that the arcuballista was a crossbow is based on the fact that Vegetius refers to it and the manuballista, which was torsion powered, separately. Therefore, if the arcuballista was not like the manuballista, it may have been a crossbow. The etymology is not clear and their definitions obscure. According to Vegetius, these were well-known devices, and hence he did not describe them in depth. Joseph Needham argues against the existence of Roman crossbowmen:

On the other hand, Arrian's earlier Ars Tactica, written around 136 AD, also mentions 'missiles shot not from a bow but from a machine' and that this machine was used on horseback while in full gallop. It is presumed that this was a crossbow.

The only pictorial evidence of Roman arcuballistas comes from sculptural reliefs in Roman Gaul depicting them in hunting scenes. These are aesthetically similar to both the Greek and Chinese crossbows, but it is not clear what kind of release mechanism they used. Archaeological evidence suggests they were similar to the rolling nut mechanism of medieval Europe.

Medieval Europe 

References to the crossbow are basically nonexistent in Europe from the 5th century until the 10th century. There is however a depiction of a crossbow as a hunting weapon on four Pictish stones from early medieval Scotland (6th to 9th centuries): St. Vigeans no. 1, Glenferness, Shandwick, and Meigle.

The crossbow reappeared again in 947 as a French weapon during the siege of Senlis and again in 984 at the siege of Verdun. Crossbows were used at the battle of Hastings in 1066 and by the 12th century they had become common battlefield weapons. The earliest extant European crossbow remains to date were found at Lake Paladru and has been dated to the 11th century.

The crossbow superseded hand bows in many European armies during the 12th century, except in England, where the longbow was more popular. Later crossbows (sometimes referred to as arbalests), utilizing all-steel prods, were able to achieve power close (and sometime superior) to longbows, but were more expensive to produce and slower to reload because they required the aid of mechanical devices such as the cranequin or windlass to draw back their extremely heavy bows. Usually these could only shoot two bolts per minute versus twelve or more with a skilled archer, often necessitating the use of a pavise (shield) to protect the operator from enemy fire. Along with polearm weapons made from farming equipment, the crossbow was also a weapon of choice for insurgent peasants such as the Taborites. Genoese crossbowmen were famous mercenaries hired throughout medieval Europe, while the crossbow also played an important role in anti-personnel defense of ships.

Crossbows were eventually replaced in warfare by gunpowder weapons. Early hand cannons had slower rates of fire and much worse accuracy than contemporary crossbows, but the arquebus (which proliferated in the mid to late 15th century) matched their rate of fire while being far more powerful. The Battle of Cerignola in 1503 was largely won by Spain through the use of matchlock arquebuses, marking the first time a major battle was won through the use of hand-held firearms. Later, similar competing tactics would feature harquebusiers or musketeers in formation with pikemen, pitted against cavalry firing pistols or carbines. While the military crossbow had largely been supplanted by firearms on the battlefield by 1525, the sporting crossbow in various forms remained a popular hunting weapon in Europe until the eighteenth century. Crossbows saw irregular use throughout the rest of the 16th century; for example, Maria Pita's husband was killed by a crossbowman of the English Armada in 1589.

Islamic world
There are no references to crossbows in Islamic texts earlier than the 14th century. Arabs in general were averse to the crossbow and considered it a foreign weapon. They called it qaus al-rijl (foot-drawn bow), qaus al-zanbūrak (bolt bow) and qaus al-faranjīyah (Frankish bow). Although Muslims did have crossbows, there seems to be a split between eastern and western types. Muslims in Spain used the typical European trigger while eastern Muslim crossbows had a more complex trigger mechanism.

Mamluk cavalry used crossbows.

Elsewhere
Oyumi were ancient Japanese artillery pieces that first appeared in the seventh century (during the Asuka Period). According to Japanese records, the Oyumi was different from the hand held crossbow also in use during the same time period. A quote from a seventh-century source seems to suggest that the Oyumi may have able to fire multiple arrows at once: "the Oyumi were lined up and fired at random, the arrows fell like rain". A ninth century Japanese artisan named Shimaki no Fubito claimed to have improved on a version of the weapon used by the Chinese; his version could rotate and fire projectiles in multiple directions. The last recorded use of the Oyumi was in 1189.

In Western Africa and Central Africa, crossbows served as a scouting weapon and for hunting, with African slaves bringing this technology to natives in America. In the US South, the crossbow was used for hunting and warfare when firearms or gunpowder were unavailable because of economic hardships or isolation. In the North of Northern America, light hunting crossbows were traditionally used by the Inuit. These are technologically similar to the African-derived crossbows, but have a different route of influence.

Spanish conquistadors continued to use crossbows in the Americas long after they were replaced in European battlefields by firearms. Only in the 1570s did firearms become completely dominant among the Spanish in the Americas.

The French and the British used a Sauterelle (French for grasshopper) in World War I. It was lighter and more portable than the Leach Trench Catapult, but less powerful. The Sauterelle replaced the Leach Catapult in British service and was in turn replaced in 1916 by the 2-inch Medium Trench Mortar and Stokes mortar.

Modern use

Hunting, leisure and science 

Crossbows are used for shooting sports and bowhunting in modern archery and for blubber biopsy samples in scientific research. In some countries such as Canada or the United Kingdom, they may be less heavily regulated than firearms, and thus more popular for hunting; some jurisdictions have bow and/or crossbow only seasons.

Modern military and paramilitary use 
In modern times, crossbows are no longer used for war, but there are still some applications. For example, in the Americas, the Peruvian army (Ejército) equips some soldiers with crossbows and rope, to establish a zip-line in difficult terrain. In Brazil the CIGS (Jungle Warfare Training Center) also trains soldiers in the use of crossbows. In the United States, SAA International Ltd manufacture a  crossbow-launched version of the U.S. Army type classified Launched Grapnel Hook (LGH), among other mine countermeasure solutions designed for the Middle Eastern theatre. It has been successfully evaluated in Cambodia and Bosnia. The concept is similar to the LGH device originally fired from a rifle, as a plastic retrieval line is attached. Reusable up to 20 times, the line can be reeled back in without exposing oneself. The device is of particular use in tactical situations where noise discipline is important.

In Europe, Barnett International sold crossbows to Serbian forces which according to The Guardian were later used "in ambushes and as a counter-sniper weapon" against the Kosovo Liberation Army during the Kosovo War in the areas of Pec and Djakovica, south west of Kosovo. Whitehall launched an investigation, though the Department of Trade and Industry established that not being "on the military list", crossbows were not covered by such export regulations. Paul Beaver of Jane's Defence Publications commented that, "They are not only a silent killer, they also have a psychological effect". Special forces in both Greece and Turkey also continue to employ the crossbow. Spain's Green Berets still use the crossbow as well.

In Asia, some Chinese armed forces use crossbows, including the special force Snow Leopard Commando Unit of the People's Armed Police and the People's Liberation Army. One justification for this comes in the crossbow's ability to stop persons carrying explosives without risk of causing detonation. During the Xinjiang riots of July 2009, crossbows were used alongside modern military hardware to quell protests. The Indian Navy's Marine Commando Force were equipped until the late 1980s with crossbows with cyanide-tipped bolts, as an alternative to suppressed handguns.

Comparison to conventional bows 
With a crossbow, archers could release a draw force far in excess of what they could have handled with a bow. Furthermore, the crossbow could hold the tension for a long time, whereas even the strongest longbowman could only hold a drawn bow for a short period of time. The ease of use of a crossbow allows it to be used effectively with little training, while other types of bows take far more skill to shoot accurately. The disadvantage is the greater weight and clumsiness to reload compared to a bow, as well as the slower rate of shooting and the lower efficiency of the acceleration system, but there would be reduced elastic hysteresis, making the crossbow a more accurate weapon.

Medieval European crossbows had a much smaller draw length than bows. This means that for the same energy to be imparted to the arrow (or bolt), the crossbow had to have a much higher draw weight.

A direct comparison between a fast hand-drawn replica crossbow and a longbow show a 6:10 rate of shooting or a 4:9 rate within 30 seconds and comparable weapons.

Legal issues

Today, the crossbow often has a complicated legal status due to the possibility of lethal use and its similarities to both firearms and archery weapons. While some jurisdictions regard crossbows the same as firearms, many others do not require any sort of license to own a crossbow. The legality of using a crossbow for hunting varies widely around the world, and even within different jurisdictions of some federal countries.

In popular culture
The Star Wars franchise features Wookiees, including Chewbacca, wielding bowcasters, crossbow-themed blasters.

In The Walking Dead, character Darryl Dixon wields a crossbow.

In George R. R. Martin's fantasy novel series A Song of Ice and Fire, crossbows are a common weapon. One is famously used by Tyrion Lannister to kill his father. That particular crossbow is featured even more prominently in the derivative HBO TV show Game of Thrones.

See also 
Arbalist (crossbowman)
Bow and arrow
Crossbow bolt
History of crossbows
Master of Crossbowmen
Match crossbow
Modern competitive archery and target archery for bows
Sauterelle
Shooting sport

References

Citations

Sources 

 
 

 
 

 
 

 Payne-Gallwey, Ralph, Sir, The Crossbow: Mediaeval and Modern, Military and Sporting; its Construction, History & Management with a Treatise on the Balista and Catapult of the Ancients and An Appendix on the Catapult, Balista & the Turkish Bow, New York : Bramhall House, 1958.

External links 

 International Crossbow Shooting Union (IAU) 
 World Crossbow Shooting Association (WCSA)
 The Crossbow by Sir Ralph Payne-Gallwey, BT

Ancient weapons
Medieval weapons
Chinese inventions
Greek inventions
 
Heraldic charges
Bows (archery)
Renaissance-era weapons
Weapons of China